Events in the year 1768 in Portugal.

Incumbents
Monarch: Joseph I

Births

10 March – Domingos Sequeira, painter (d. 1837)
15 December – Infanta Mariana Victoria of Portugal, princess (d. 1788)

Deaths 

4 July – Paula de Odivelas, nun and royal mistress (b. 1701).

References

 
1760s in Portugal
Portugal
Years of the 18th century in Portugal
Portugal